Zakhmi Aurat (English : Wounded Woman) is a 1988 Indian Hindi movie starring Dimple Kapadia and Raj Babbar and directed by Avtar Bhogal. Kapadia played Kiran Dutt, a police officer who is subject to gang rape and, when the judicial system fails to convict the criminals, unites with other rape victims to castrate the rapists in revenge. A financial success, the film opened to a polarised reaction from critics and further attracted wide coverage for its lengthy and brutal rape scene involving Kapadia. Khalid Mohammed of The Times of India noted Kapadia's "power packed performance" but criticised the rape sequence as "utter lasciviousness" and "vulgarity spattering through the screen". Feminist magazine Manushi panned its low cinematic quality, including the absurdity of the action scenes and the "ugly kind of titillation" in the rape scene, but believed it "stays closer to women's experience" than other films of its sort; the review was particularly approving of Kapadia's work: "What really carries the film through is Dimple Kapadia's performance—low key, moving and charming without being at all clinging or seductive. She brings a conviction to her role that is rare among Bombay heroines." In later years, The Times of India labelled it a "B-grade movie" though it noted Kapadia's convincing portrayal of "anguish and bitterness at being denied justice". M.L. Dhawan from The Tribune, while documenting the famous Hindi films of 1988, praised Kapadia for "proving her mettle as an actress of intensity and passion." Subhash Jha, however, wrote in 2002 that its box-office outcome notwithstanding, Zakhmi Aurat "turned into quite an embarrassment for its leading lady".

Plot
The film is about women who have been raped and how they get revenge by castrating the rapists.
(This film is inspired by the 1986 X-rated thriller The Ladies Club).
Kiran Dutt  is a woman police officer who is gang raped by six goons in gruesome fashion - her jeans and panty flung on the fan, her hands and legs spread wide apart and tied to bed posts, as testimony to the ghastly act taking place below. 
In the film the victim's trust in the Indian judicial system is shattered when despite her testimony, her rapists walk free.
She decides to punish the rapists by forming a gang of wronged women and the modus operandi is to first identify the rapists, trap them and then castrate them one by one.
The film was generously sprinkled with explicit scenes falsifying the claim of the filmmaker of an anti-rape film. Watch what happens when she is taken to court. 
Will she get justice? or will she be punished for the crimes she has committed??

Cast

 Dimple Kapadia as Inspector Kiran Dutt
 Raj Babbar as Suraj Prakash
 Anupam Kher as Advocate Mahendranath
 Rama Vij as Dr. Asha Mehta
 Aruna Irani as Salma
 Beena Banerjee as Mrs. Mahendranath 
 Satyendra Kapoor as Shanti's Father
 Om Shivpuri as Police Commissioner 
 Puneet Issar as Sukhdev (Rapist)
 Tej Sapru as Suryakant (Rapist)
 Shiva Rindani as Ranjit (Rapist) 
 Avtar Gill as Pinky's Rapist
 Roopesh Kumar as Raj
 Mangal Dhillon as Mr. Mehta
 Leela Mishra as Shanti's Grandmother
 Kalpana Iyer as Kanta
 Chand Usmani as Suraj's Mother 
Moolchand as Moolchand
Surbhi Javeri Vyas as Neelu Castration Gang Member
 Madhu Malhotra as Castration Gang Member

Soundtrack
All songs are written by Faruk Kaiser.

Production
Dialogues of this movie written by Iqbal Durrani became quite popular.

References

External links

1988 films
1988 action films
Indian erotic films
Films about rape in India
1980s Hindi-language films
Gang rape in fiction
Indian rape and revenge films
Films scored by Bappi Lahiri